The 2019 FIBA U18 European Championship Division C was the 15th edition of the Division C of the FIBA U18 European Championship. It was played in Andorra la Vella, Andorra, from 28 July to 4 August 2019. 9 teams participated in the competition. Cyprus men's national under-18 basketball team won the tournament.

Participating teams
  (24th place, 2018 FIBA U18 European Championship Division B)

First round

Group A

Group B

5th–9th place classification

Championship playoffs

Final standings

References

External links
FIBA official website

FIBA U18 European Championship Division C
2019–20 in European basketball
International basketball competitions hosted by Andorra
Sports competitions in Andorra la Vella
August 2019 sports events in Europe